Auburn Mills Historic District is a national historic district located near Yorklyn, New Castle County, Delaware in Auburn Valley State Park.  It encompasses 9 contributing buildings, 4 contributing sites, and 1 contributing structure that were mostly between 1890 and 1910 and related to the Auburn Mill.  The district contains industrial, commercial, and domestic structures.  They include the Horatio Gates Garrett House, Israel Marshall House (1897), The "Bank" worker's row house, Auburn Store/NVP Office, Frame Workers' Housing Site, Insulite Mill (1900), Blacksmith's Shop Site, Auburn Mill, Utility Shed, and Trolley Line Trestle Piers.

It was added to the National Register of Historic Places in 1980.

Gallery

References

Historic districts on the National Register of Historic Places in Delaware
Historic districts in New Castle County, Delaware
National Register of Historic Places in New Castle County, Delaware